A Grandpa for Christmas is a 2007 American made-for-television comedy-drama film starring Ernest Borgnine and Juliette Goglia. It premiered on Hallmark Channel on November 24, 2007.

Plot
Bert (Ernest Borgnine) is a retired Hollywood actor who has been estranged from his only daughter Marie (Tracy Nelson) for many years.  When she ends up in the hospital following a car accident, Social Services places her 10-year-old daughter, Becca (Juliette Goglia), with the grandfather she has never met.  The generation gap is apparent as Bert and Becca try to adjust to their new lives together.

In taking in the granddaughter, he never knew about, he is faced with the resentment toward him due to these stories told by the grandmother.  Bert is faced with the dilemma of whether to tell his granddaughter, and later his daughter, the truth, which if they believe him, may ruin their memory of the late grandmother, or stay quiet. The dilemma is resolved when one of Bert’s friends tells the mother the truth.

Cast
Ernest Borgnine as Bert O'Riley
Juliette Goglia as Becca O'Riley
Tracy Nelson as Marie O'Riley
Katherine Helmond as Roxie
Richard Libertini as Karl
Quinn Redeker as Jack Fast
Jamie Farr as Adam

Reception
In prime time, the movie led the network to rank #1 in the time period, #1 for the weekend, and #4 for the week. It also became the third-highest-ever-rated original movie premiere on Hallmark Channel to the premiere date.

Awards
The Dove Foundation gave A Grandpa for Christmas the Dove Family Approved Seal on November 6, 2007.
Ernest Borgnine received a Golden Globe nomination for his performance.

Production notes
David N. Lawrence wrote A Christmas Song, the song that Becca sings at the recital.

See also 
 List of Christmas films

External links
 
 
 A Grandpa for Christmas on Hallmark Channel
 A Grandpa for Christmas on Hallmark Channel's Press Site

References

2007 television films
2007 films
Christmas television films
2000s English-language films
Hallmark Channel original films
Films set in hospitals
American Christmas films
Films directed by Harvey Frost